Virgílio José Pereira do Nascimento, known as Gila (born 5 February 1967) is a Portuguese football coach and a former player.

Club career
He made his Primeira Liga debut for Campomaiorense on 20 August 1995 in a game against Vitória Guimarães.

Honours
Beira-Mar
Taça de Portugal: 1998–99

References

External links
 

1967 births
Living people
People from Alcobaça, Portugal
Portuguese footballers
G.C. Alcobaça players
Caldas S.C. players
S.C. Campomaiorense players
Liga Portugal 2 players
Primeira Liga players
S.C. Beira-Mar players
C.F. União players
Portuguese football managers
Association football defenders
Sportspeople from Leiria District